The canton of Montauban-de-Bretagne is an administrative division of the Ille-et-Vilaine department, in northwestern France. At the French canton reorganisation which came into effect in March 2015, it was expanded from 8 to 24 communes (4 of which were merged into the new communes La Chapelle-du-Lou-du-Lac and Montauban-de-Bretagne). Its seat is in Montauban-de-Bretagne.

Composition

It consists of the following communes: 
 
Bécherel 
Bléruais
Boisgervilly
La Chapelle-Chaussée
La Chapelle-du-Lou-du-Lac
Le Crouais
Gaël
Irodouër
Landujan
Langan
Médréac
Miniac-sous-Bécherel
Montauban-de-Bretagne
Muel 
Quédillac
Romillé
Saint-Malon-sur-Mel
Saint-Maugan
Saint-Méen-le-Grand
Saint-Onen-la-Chapelle
Saint-Pern
Saint-Uniac

Councillors

Pictures of the canton

References

Cantons of Ille-et-Vilaine